Once Caldas S.A., simply known as Once Caldas, is a professional Colombian football team based in Manizales, that currently plays in the Categoría Primera A. They play their home games at the Palogrande stadium.

They were the surprise winners of the Copa Libertadores in 2004. The club was founded in 1961 after the merger of Deportes Caldas and Deportivo Manizales (also known as Once Deportivo).

History
In 1950, Deportes Caldas won the Campeonato Profesional, as the Colombian professional football league was named at the time.

Once Caldas was founded in 1959 after the fusion of Once Deportivo and Deportes Caldas. Once Deportivo was founded in 1930 while Deportes Caldas was founded at the end of the 1940s. However, both teams, for various reasons, went defunct. Carlos Gómez Escobar was in favor of reviving Deportes Caldas, but Eduardo Gómez Arrubla's idea was to bring back Once Deportivo. Thanks to the mediation of Dr. Hermán Bueno Ramirez, the three co-founders arrived at the compromise to fuse the existing teams into an entirely new entity, Once Caldas.

In 1961, the merged club debuted in the Campeonato Profesional. The club finished in the 7th position of the competition.

In 1998, Once Caldas was the first division's runner-up. Deportivo Cali defeated the club in the final. In the first leg, in Cali, the home team won 4–0. The second leg, in Manizales, ended in a 0–0 draw. That year the club also disputed its first international competition, the Copa CONMEBOL. Once Caldas was eliminated in the first round by Santos, of Brazil. In the first leg, in Santos, Santos won 2–1. In the second leg, in Manizales, Once Caldas won 2–1, but was defeated 3–2 in the penalty shootout.

In 1999, the club participated in the Copa Libertadores de América for the first time. Once Caldas was in the same group as Deportivo Cali and two Argentine clubs, Vélez Sársfield and River Plate. The side finished in the last position, but only two points behind Vélez Sársfield, which was the group's leader.

In 2002, Once Caldas played in the Copa Libertadores again. Olimpia, of Paraguay, Universidad Católica, of Chile, and Flamengo, of Brazil were in Once Caldas' group. After finishing in the third position, only ahead of Flamengo, the club was eliminated.

In 2003, the side won the first division's Apertura championship, after beating Junior in the final. In Barranquilla, the match ended in a 0–0 draw. In the second leg, Once Caldas won 1–0 in Manizales.

In 2004, the club again played in the Copa Libertadores. After beating Boca Juniors in the penalty shootout, the side, managed by Luis Fernando Montoya, won the competition for the first time. As the Copa Libertadores champions, the club played the Intercontinental Cup against UEFA Champions League champions Porto, of Portugal, in Yokohama, Japan. After a 0–0 draw, the club was defeated 8–7 in the penalty shootout.

In 2005, as the previous year's champion, Once Caldas tried to defend its title in the Copa Libertadores. Chivas de Guadalajara (Mexico), Cobreloa (Chile), and San Lorenzo (Argentina) were in Once Caldas' group. The club finished in second place, two points behind Chivas. In the second stage, the side was eliminated by Tigres UANL of Mexico. In that year, the club also participated in the Recopa Sudamericana, having played against Boca Juniors. In the first leg, in Buenos Aires, Boca Juniors won 3–1. In the second leg, in Manizales, Once Caldas won 2–1 but Boca won 4–3 on aggregate score.

2004 Copa Libertadores campaign
In 2004, Once Caldas won the Copa Libertadores. The matches played by the club are listed below:

Coach

 Luis Montoya

Players

Uniform
In early 2005, Once Caldas decided to leave behind the brand Bogota FSS and go to the German brand Adidas. After concluding its contract with Adidas, Once Caldas switches to Peruvian company Walon Sport, since the 2008 season. until 2016 where they left Walon Sport for Errea. In the 2019 season Once Caldas left Errea to dress the local brand Sheffy. In the 2023 season, they left Sheffy and joined local brand Hillside.

 Home: White shirt, white shorts and white socks.
 Away: Black shirt, black shorts and black socks.

Stadium

Once Caldas plays its home matches at Estadio Palogrande, located in Manizales. The stadium was inaugurated in 1936, and had its maximum capacity expanded to its current 43,553 spectators in 2010.

Honours

Domestic
Categoría Primera A
Winners (4): 1950, 2003–I, 2009–I, 2010–II
Runners-up (2): 1998, 2011–II

Copa Colombia
Runners-up (2): 2008, 2018

International
Copa Libertadores
Winners (1): 2004

Recopa Sudamericana
Runners-up: 2005

Intercontinental Cup
Runners-up: 2004

Players

Current squad

Out on loan

Records

Most appearances

Top scorers

Managers

 Alfredo Cuezzo (1950–60)
 José Próspero Fabrini (1961)
 Roberto Martino (1962)
 Francisco Villegas (1962–63)
 Segundo Tessori (1964)
  (1964–65)
 Wilfredo Camacho (1965)
 Alfredo Cuezzo (1965–66)
 Simón Herrerías (1966–67)
 Ramón Cardona (1967)
  (1967–68)
 Rogelio Muñiz (1968–69)
 Ángel Chávez (1969)
 Alfredo Cuezzo (1969–70)
 Pablo Ansaldo (1970)
 Rogelio Muñiz (1971)
 Ángel Chávez (1972)
 Rogelio Muñiz (1972)
 Ramón Cardona (1973)
 Amadeo Carrizo (1973)
 Dante Homérico Lugo (1973)
 Rogelio Muñiz (1973–74)
 Alfredo Cuezzo (1974)
 Miguel Ángel Vidal (1975)
 Gilberto Fonseca (1975–77)
 Jaime Fonseca (1977)
 Eduardo Luján Manera (1978)
 Felipe Ribaudo (1979)
 Carlos Antonietta (1980–81)
 Gonzalo González (1981)
 Efraín Sánchez (1981)
 Alfonso Botero (1982)
 Juan Carlos Sarnari (1982)
 Américo Pérez (1983)
 Ómar Patiño (1983)
 Américo Pérez (1983)
 Alfonso Núñez (1984)
 Américo Pérez (1984)
 Juan Manuel Guerra (1984)
 Jaime Silva (1985)
 Francisco Maturana (1986)
 Hernando Piñeros (1986)
 Ómar Patiño (1986)
 Alberto Tardivo (1986)
 Diego Umaña (1987)
 Mario Agudelo (1987)
 Janio Cabezas (1987–88)
 Carlos Miguel Dizz (1988)
 Leonel Montoya (1988)
 Carlos Miguel Dizz (1989–90)
 Moisés Pachón (1990)
 Alfonso Núñez (1990)
  (1991)
 Sergio Santín (1991)
  (1991–92)
 Sergio Santín (1992)
 Orlando Restrepo (1992)
 Víctor Luna (1992)
 Carlos Restrepo (1992–94)
 Orlando Restrepo (1995–97)
 Joaquin Castro (1996–97)
  (1996–98)
 Alexis García (1999)
 Juan Eugenio Jiménez (2000)
  (1 July 2001 – 30 June 2002)
 Luis Montoya (2003–04)
 Carlos Alberto Valencia (2004)
 Jaime de la Pava (2005)
  (2006)
 Santiago Escobar (1 Jan 2007 – 1 March 2007)
 Fernando Castro (2007 – 30 June 2007)
  (Nov 2007 – 8 May)
 Jorge Luis Bernal (May 2008 – Nov 2008)
  (29 Nov 2008 – 6 November 2009)
 Juan Carlos Osorio (1 Jan 2010 – 27 December 2011)
 Luis Pompilio Páez (27 Dec 2011 – 3 April 2012)
 Leonel Álvarez (15 May 2012 – 30 June 2012)
 Guillermo Ángel Hoyos (1 July 2012 – 8 December 2012)
 Santiago Escobar (18 Dec 2012 – 3 December 2013)
 Flabio Torres (7 Dec 2013 – 27 February 2015)
 Javier Torrente (25 May 2015 – 30 August 2016)
 Hernán Lisi (1 Sep 2016 – 24 April 2017)
 Herney Duque (25 April 2017 – 5 June 2017)
 Francisco Maturana (6 June 2017 – 14 November 2017)
 Herney Duque (14 Nov 2017 – Present)
 Hubert Bodhert (7 Dec 2017 – Present)

References

External links

 
Palogrande Stadium – World Stadiums

 
Football clubs in Colombia
Association football clubs established in 1961
1961 establishments in Colombia
Categoría Primera A clubs
Copa Libertadores winning clubs